Millership is a surname. Notable people with the surname include:

Harry Millership (1889–1959), British footballer
Walter Millership (1910–1978), British footballer 

Surnames of Old English origin